The Yu River (郁江 / 鬱江) is a river in Hubei and Chongqing provinces, China. It is a tributary of the Wu River.

Rivers of Hubei